Mark Edward Smith (born May 7, 1970) is an American former professional baseball outfielder. He played in Major League Baseball (MLB) for the Baltimore Orioles, Pittsburgh Pirates, Florida Marlins, Montreal Expos, and Milwaukee Brewers. Smith also played for the Yakult Swallows of Nippon Professional Baseball (NPB), and the Hanwha Eagles of the KBO League.

College career
Mark Smith played college baseball at the University of Southern California. In 1990, Smith played collegiate summer baseball for the Wareham Gatemen of the Cape Cod Baseball League (CCBL). He batted .408 and led the Gatemen to the league title. Smith was named league MVP and was inducted into the CCBL Hall of Fame in 2011.

Professional career
Mark Smith began his professional career with the Frederick Keys in 1991.  His best minor league season was in 1992 with the Class AA Hagerstown Suns, where he was selected as an outfielder for the Eastern League End of Season All Star Team,

Smith played Major League Baseball between 1994 and 2003 for the Baltimore Orioles, Pittsburgh Pirates, Florida Marlins, Montreal Expos and Milwaukee Brewers. In 1999, he played in Japan for the Yakult Swallows. In 2005, he played in South Korea for the Hanwha Eagles, but was released on the regular season.

What may be regarded as the most noteworthy of Smith's accomplishments on the baseball diamond occurred on July 12, 1997. Smith hit a 3-run home run off of John Hudek in the bottom of the 10th inning in a scoreless game to give the Pittsburgh Pirates a 3-0 win over the Houston Astros. The home run also ended the first extra-innings combined no-hitter in MLB history. Francisco Córdova no-hit the Astros in the first 9 innings, while reliever Ricardo Rincón pitched a hitless 10th inning for the Pirates.

Award for heroism
In 2001, Smith received the Steve Palermo Award for heroism from the Baseball Assistance Team (B.A.T.) for his actions in July 2000, when he rescued a man whose car had crashed and was on fire.

References

External links

Nippon Professional Baseball
The Baseball Gauge
Venezuela Winter League
Career statistics and player information from KBO League

1970 births
Living people
All-American college baseball players
American expatriate baseball players in Canada
American expatriate baseball players in Japan
American expatriate baseball players in South Korea
Baltimore Orioles players
Baseball players from Pasadena, California
Bowie Baysox players
Calgary Cannons players
Carolina Mudcats players
Florida Marlins players
Frederick Keys players
Hagerstown Suns players
Hanwha Eagles players
Indianapolis Indians players
KBO League outfielders
Leones del Caracas players
American expatriate baseball players in Venezuela
Major League Baseball left fielders
Major League Baseball right fielders
Milwaukee Brewers players
Montreal Expos players
Nashville Sounds players
Ottawa Lynx players
Pittsburgh Pirates players
Rochester Red Wings players
Scranton/Wilkes-Barre Red Barons players
USC Trojans baseball players
Wareham Gatemen players
Yakult Swallows players